is a bus company in the Kintetsu Group.

Major routes

Expressway bus routes 
Osaka/Kyoto - Sendai (Forest)
Osaka/Kyoto - Tokyo/Ueno/Yokohama (Flying Liner)
Osaka/Kyoto - Shinjuku/Hachioji ("Twinkle")
Osaka/Kyoto - Nagasaki (Oranda)
Osaka/Kyoto - Kumamoto (Sunrise)
Osaka/Kyoto - Miyazaki ("Ohisama")
Universal CityWalk Osaka - Kansai Airport

External links 

 Kintetsu Bus 

Bus companies of Japan
Companies based in Osaka Prefecture
Transport companies established in 1999
Japanese companies established in 1999
Kintetsu Group Holdings